Barbara Frisken a Canadian physicist who is a professor at the Simon Fraser University. Her research considers soft matter and the realisation of Polymer Electrolyte Membrane Fuel Cells. She is President of the Canadian Association of Physicists.

Early life and education 
Frisken is from Canada. Her father William Frisken, was a professor of Particle Physics at York University. She was an undergraduate student at Queen's University at Kingston, and moved to Northwestern University for a graduate degree. Frisken earned her doctorate at the University of British Columbia. Her doctoral research involved investigating the behaviour of nematic liquid crystals in electromagnetic fields. She moved to University of California, Santa Barbara, where she worked as a postdoctoral scholar.

Research and career 
Frisken joined the faculty of Simon Fraser University in 1992, where she studies soft matter, and looks to uncover structure-property relationships in molecular systems. Frisken has studied gels, polymers and colloidal materials. She developed dynamic light scattering, a technique used to characterise the size of nanoparticles. 

Frisken worked on novel polymeric materials for using in Polymer Electrolyte Membrane Fuel Cells. High conductivity in polymeric materials is related to the morphology and nanostructure. These materials can be designed to conduct anions or protons. Frisken has shown that continuity of the hydrophilic regions is critical to improving conductivity, whilst the hydrophobic regions contain the membrane size. Her research combines characterisation techniques such as small-angle X-ray scattering and neutron scattering with molecular dynamics simulations to understand and optimise polymeric materials.

In 2012, Chris Hadfield took some of Frisken's materials to the International Space Station to study crystallisation dynamics in space.

Academic service 
In 2006, Frisken was made Chair of the Department of Physics at Simon Fraser University. She revamped undergraduate teaching, and continues to serve on their curriculum committee. She has held various positions in the Canadian Association of Physicists, including overseeing their Condensed Matter Physics division, the Committee to Encourage Women in Physics and Committee on Academic Affairs. She was elected Vice President in 2021, and President in 2022.

Selected publications

References 

Year of birth missing (living people)
Living people
Canadian women physicists
20th-century Canadian physicists
20th-century Canadian women scientists
21st-century Canadian physicists
21st-century Canadian women scientists
Queen's University at Kingston alumni
Northwestern University alumni
University of British Columbia alumni
University of California, Santa Barbara people
Academic staff of Simon Fraser University